Lipu River, also known as Changtan River and Xiuren River, is a tributary of the Li River in northern Guangxi, China. The river rises in Mount Dayao in Zhongliang Township, Jinxiu Yao Autonomous County, and flows generally north through the towns of Xiuren and Licheng of Lipu, past the town of Pingle County, where it flows into the Li River from the west.

References

Bibliography

Rivers of Guangxi